Cradle of Filth was formed in Suffolk, England, in 1991.  The band's original members consisted of vocalist Dani Filth, guitarist Paul Ryan, keyboardist Ben Ryan (Paul's brother), bassist John Pritchard and drummer Darren Gardner. With this line-up, Cradle of Filth recorded a demo in 1992, titled Invoking the Unclean. Soon after, they recorded their second demo, Orgiastic Pleasures Foul with new guitarist Robin Eaglestone (aka Robin Graves) and new drummer Was Sarginson. Robin left the band shortly afterwards, but following the departure of John Pritchard, Eaglestone returned to take his place as bassist. Guitarist Paul Allender joined the band at the same time. Following these changes, another demo was recorded, titled Total Fucking Darkness (released commercially in 2014, bolstered with rehearsal sessions and a surviving track from the abandoned Goetia album). Sarginson left the band soon after, paving the way for the entry of drummer Nicholas Barker.

Cradle of Filth signed with Cacophonous Records in 1994, releasing their debut, The Principle of Evil Made Flesh. A series of differences between band members arose, and there were also problems between the band and the label. Their second work, the EP V Empire or Dark Faerytales in Phallustein, issued in 1996, saw further changes in the line-up. The Ryan brothers and Allender left, and Stuart Anstis (guitarist) and Damien Gregori (keyboardist) joined. While writing material for a new album, the band negotiated their departure from Cacophonous, and in November 1996, signed with European label Music for Nations and guitarist Gian Pyres joined. Later that year, they released Dusk... and Her Embrace, an album that substantially expanded the group's growing cult following.

Their next album was Cruelty and the Beast, released in 1998 featured new keyboardist Les Smith. Next year the group returned with From the Cradle to Enslave, an EP that featured new drummer Adrian Erlandsson (formerly of Sweden's At the Gates and The Haunted), as Barker had departed to join Dimmu Borgir. The band's several lineup changes continued apace as Paul Allender rejoined the group and Martin Powell (ex-Anathema and My Dying Bride) replaced Smith on keyboards for the full-length album Midian, Cradle's last for Music For Nations, which was appropriately released on Halloween 2000. Bitter Suites to Succubi was released on the band's own Abracadaver label in the UK and Spitfire Records in the US in 2001. The group signed to Sony for one album in 2003, adding a choir and orchestra for Damnation and a Day, and moved to Roadrunner Records for 2004's Nymphetamine, 2006's Thornography, and 2008's Godspeed on the Devil's Thunder. 2010's Darkly, Darkly, Venus Aversa was independently released by Abracadaver through Peaceville. In 2015 the band released Hammer of the Witches. In 2016 the original version of Dusk and Her Embrace (recorded with the line-up of The Principle of Evil Made Flesh but abandoned) was released for the first time.

As of 2009, Cradle of Filth had sold about 800,000 albums in the United States and four million records worldwide. Metal Hammer magazine called them the most successful British metal band since Iron Maiden.

Albums

Studio albums

Live albums

Compilation albums

Extended plays

Demos

Singles

Covers 
Cradle of Filth are well known for their extensive list of covers (usually included on the special editions).

Videos

Video albums

Music videos

See also 
 Cradle of Fear
 From the Cradle to the Grave
 The Gospel of Filth
 Dominator

Footnotes 
 Re-released in 2007 by Peaceville Records, with the new title of Eleven Burial Masses. The CD & DVD package consists of the entire first disc of Live Bait for the Dead, plus the DVD Heavy, Left-Handed and Candid without its original bonus features.

References

External links 
 Cradle of Filth

Discography
Heavy metal group discographies
Discographies of British artists